Church Street is a historic street in Yarmouth, Maine, United States. It was one of the first streets laid out after the town's population moved inland from the Broad Cove area in the 19th century. Several of its buildings are homes dating to the late 18th and early 19th centuries.

The street is named for the Old Baptist Meetinghouse, which stands opposite its western end. It was completed in 1796, and is now listed on the National Register of Historic Places.

Architecture 
John and Julie Dunn ran a store at 3 Church Street.

Reuben Byram built the building at 6 Church Street in 1804.

It is believed that Otis Briggs Pratt built the house at 14 Church Street, on land owned by Silas Merrill, between 1807 and 1812. Silas Merill also lived here. It later served as the homestead for the potter Nathaniel Foster and remained in the family until 1910.

An 1804 Federal-style house stands at 21 Church.

The Old John Corliss House, at number 35, dates from 1800.

Reverend Thomas Green (1761–1814), the first pastor at the nearby Baptist church, lived at 40 Church, built in 1798.

References 

Streets in Yarmouth, Maine